Isabella Lickbarrow (5 November 178410 February 1847) was an English poet from Kendal who is sometimes associated with the Lake Poets. She published two collections: Poetical Effusions (1814) and A Lament upon the Death of Her Royal Highness the Princess Charlotte; and Alfred, a Vision (1818). Her work covers a wide variety of subjects, but scholars have noted in particular her topographical poetry and political poetry about the Napoleonic Wars.

Life

Lickbarrow lived in Kendal for most, if not all of her life. Her mother died when she was five years old and her father when she was 20, after which she turned to publishing poetry as a way to earn a living for herself and two sisters. This is apparent from the preface to Poetical Effusions (1814), which describes the work as a way to "assist the humble labours of herself and her orphan sisters".

Lickbarrow came from a Nonconformist family. Her father, originally a Quaker, became a Unitarian. She was a relative of John Dalton, who subscribed to Poetical Effusions, her first collection. 

A near-contemporary article in Notes and Queries claims Lickbarrow was "more than once an inmate of the Asylum for Lunatics, at Lancaster", but present-day scholars have not verified this claim.

Isabella Lickbarrow died of tuberculosis in Kendal, in 1847.

Poetry
Lickbarrow began publishing in the Westmorland Advertiser, a local newspaper, in November 1811 and quickly gained a following, which led to the release of Poetical Effusions by the newspaper's publisher in 1814.

Effusions was funded by subscription, as were many literary works at the time. Her subscribers included Sara Hutchinson, who was William Wordsworth's sister-in-law and a friend and muse of Coleridge, Wordsworth himself, Thomas De Quincey, and Robert Southey. William Axon, writing in Notes and Queries in 1908, recalled Effusions in elegiac tones: "[L]et us hope that the result of the publication was to make life easier for Isabella Lickbarrow, although it has not secured her the immortality of Sappho."

Lickbarrow's poetry was versatile and evinced an interest in matters both at home and abroad. Jonathan Wordsworth, describing Lickbarrow as a "poet of genuine individuality", notes that her poems show a preoccupation with the Napoleonic Wars, among other subjects. Behrendt observes that her poems on war attend to the troubles that soldiers, often poor and ill-served by the government, faced when returning home from the campaign.

Lickbarrow "bid the nation rejoice" upon Napoleon's abdication.

Knowles argues that "Lickbarrow's pre-Waterloo poetry voices a strong objection to Britain's role in the war in Europe", observing that this could be expected given her Quaker background. Knowles also suggests that Lickbarrow's Lament upon the Death of Her Royal Highness the Princess Charlotte; and Alfred, a Vision (1818), about the death of Princess Charlotte of Wales in 1817, reflects unease about Britain's future — given that George IV, subject to widespread popular disdain, was about to succeed his father — and views Britain's ancient history, exemplified in the person of Alfred the Great, as a potential source of wisdom for the country in the early 19th century. Knowles observes that Lickbarrow was "one of the only female poets to continue to write overtly political poetry in the post-Waterloo period". 

Although her subjects included politics and foreign affairs, Lickbarrow also wrote frequent topographical poetry about locations in the Lake District and elsewhere, including Underbarrow Scar, Esthwaite Water, and South Stack Lighthouse (in Wales).

Poetical Effusions went out of print after its first publication, until 2004, when it was released in an edited collection by the Wordsworth Trust. An anonymous contemporary reviewer of the Effusions wrote in the Monthly Review: "[t]he introduction to these verses is written with a simplicity and humility which are sufficient to mollify the severest critic; and the compositions, though not brilliant, display much chastened feeling, and a poetical perception of the beauties of nature." Feldman observes that the work "contains unusual variety for a first book," noting that it features poems on a number of different subjects and in various styles.

Works
Lickbarrow published two collections and numerous poems in local newspapers.
 Printed twice in 1814, once locally in Kendal and once in London.

 A much-noted composition on the publication of poems in newspapers that concerns neither war or topography.

Notes

Sources

Further reading
 A present-day edited collection of all Lickbarrow's works.

See also
List of 18th-century British working-class writers

1784 births
1847 deaths
19th-century English poets
People from Kendal
War poets
19th-century British women writers